The Espousals of the Blessed Virgin Mary or Marriage of the Virgin Mary is a Christian feast is celebrated by certain parts of the Roman Catholic Church such as the Oblates of Saint Joseph. It was formerly generally observed on January 23, but was removed from many local calendars by the Sacred Congregation of Rites.

History 

In Matthew 1:16, Joseph is described as the husband of Mary. It is probable that Joseph and Mary were betrothed in Nazareth. The term "betrothal" indicates more than an engagement. It was customary in that time and place to celebrate marriage in two stages, the first being the contractual arrangements culminating in consent or "betrothal". After a period of around one year in which the couple were preparing for conjugal living, the second stage of actually conveying the wife to their new home would be accompanied by a great feast such as the Marriage Feast at Cana recounted in the John 2:1-11.

Feast day

The first definite knowledge of a feast in honour of the espousals of Mary dates from August 29, 1517, when with nine other Masses in honour of Mary, it was granted by Leo X to the Nuns of the Annunciation, founded by Saint Jeanne de Valois. In certain particular churches the espousals of the Virgin Mary and St. Joseph are honoured with an office on January 23. The Oblates of St. Joseph celebrate January 23 as the feast of “The Holy Spouses Mary and Joseph”.

Gaspar Bertoni, founder of the Stigmatines, chose Mary and Joseph, in the context of their espousals, as patrons of the Congregation of the Sacred Stigmata.

In art 

In art the subject can be covered in several different scenes, and the betrothal of Mary, with Joseph's blossoming rod, is often shown.  Wedding processions are also shown, especially in the Early Medieval period. The scene, or scenes, is a common component in larger cycles of the Life of the Virgin and thus very frequently found, especially in the Middle Ages; it is not found in the typical cycle in a Book of hours.

The marriage scene has been painted by, among others, Giotto, Perugino, Raphael, Domenico Ghirlandaio (1485–90, at the Tornabuoni Chapel), Bernardo Daddi (now in the Royal Collection), Veronese (in San Polo church, Venice), and Pieter van Lint (1640, Antwerp Cathedral). The subject is depicted in a fresco in the German Chapel at the Shrine of the Holy House in Loretto, Italy; in a sculpture in the left portico of Sagrada Família Basilica in Barcelona, Spain; and in a stained glass window at St. Rita Basilica, Cascia, Italy.

References

External links 
 Aquinas, Thomas. "Summa Theologica III q29. Of the espousals of the Mother of God"
 Sansonvino, Andrea. "The Wedding", marble sculpture, Loretto, Italy, (1526)

Mary, mother of Jesus
Catholic devotions
Mary
Saint Joseph (husband of Mary)
Saints days
Catholic holy days
Catholic liturgy
January observances